George Bennett  (31 January 1804 – 29 September 1893) was an English-born Australian physician and naturalist, winner of the Clarke Medal in 1890.

Early life
Bennett was born at Plymouth, England. On leaving school at 15 years of age he visited Ceylon and on his return studied for the medical profession, initially at Plymouth, later at the Middlesex Hospital and the Hunterian School of Medicine. He obtained the degree of M.R.C.S. on 7 March 1828, and later became F.R.C.S.

Career
After qualifying as a physician Bennett obtained employment as a ship's surgeon, and visited Sydney, New South Wales, in 1829. In 1832 his friend Richard Owen was engaged in examining the structure and relations of the mammary glands of the Ornithorhyncus, and Bennett became so interested that on leaving England shortly afterwards for Australia he determined while in that country to find a solution of the question.

In May 1832 Bennett left Plymouth on a voyage which terminated almost exactly two years later. An account of this appeared in 1834 in two volumes under the title Wanderings in New South Wales, Batavia, Pedir Coast, Singapore and China. In 1835 Bennett published in the Transactions of the Zoological Society of London, vol. I, pp. 229–58, "Notes on the Natural History and Habits of the Ornithorhyncus paradoxus, Blum", one of the earliest papers of importance written on the platypus.

In 1833, Bennett lent support in absentia to the founding of what became the Royal Entomological Society of London. Bennett was awarded the honorary gold medal of the Royal College of Surgeons in recognition of his contributions to zoological science. Bennett went to Australia again in 1836 and established a successful practice as a physician at Sydney. However he kept up his general interest in science, and acted as honorary secretary of the Australian Museum which had just been established. He compiled A Catalogue of the Specimens of Natural History and Miscellaneous Curiosities deposited in the Australian Museum  which was published in 1837. In 1860 he brought out his Gatherings of a Naturalist in Australasia. He kept up a correspondence with his early friend Sir Richard Owen, to whom he had sent the first specimens of the chambered nautilus to arrive in England, and with Darwin and other scientists of the time. He was much interested in the Sydney Botanic Gardens and the Acclimatization Society, and was a vice-president of the Zoological Society, and a member of the board of the Australian Museum.

In addition to the nautilus, Bennett brought a Sumatran gibbon specimen to England as well as a young Erromangan girl named Elau, who was the first native of the New Hebrides to visit Europe.

Bennett also contributed papers to The Lancet, the Medical Gazette, the Journal of Botany, Loudon's Magazine of Natural History, and other journals. The variety of his interests may be suggested by the fact that he published in 1871 papers on "A Trip to Queensland in Search of Fossils" and on "The Introduction, Cultivation and Economic Uses of the Orange and Others of the Citron Tribe".

Late life and legacy
Bennett was 84 years of age when he contributed the chapter on "Mammals" to the Handbook of Sydney, prepared for the Sydney meeting of the Australasian Association for the Advancement of Science held in 1888. The Royal Society of New South Wales awarded Bennett the Clarke memorial medal in 1890 for his valuable contributions to the natural history of Australia. Bennett died in Sydney on 29 September 1893.

Bennett is commemorated in the scientific names of the dwarf cassowary (Casuarius bennettii), Bennett's tree-kangaroo (Dendrolagus bennettianus), Bennett's two-pored dragon (Diporiphora bennettii), and Bennett's water snake (Myrrophis bennetti).

He left a large library of books on Australiana that was purchased by William Dymock.

Family
Bennett married three times: on 28 November 1835 to Julia Anne Ludovina Cameron (c. 1820 – 15 June 1846), daughter of Charles Cameron and step-daughter of John Finnis. She took her own life by taking prussic acid. They had two sons and three daughters. He married Charlotte James Elliott (c. 1817 – 20 February 1853) on 10 December 1846; they had one son. He married Sarah Jane Adcock  on 4 January 1854; their two children died as infants.

Works authored
Bennett, George (1834).  Wanderings in New South Wales, Batavia, Pedir Coast, Singapore and China: being the journal of a naturalist in those countries, during 1832, 1833 and 1834 (Vol. 1)  London: Richard Bentley, University of Hong Kong Libraries, Digital Initiatives, China Through Western Eyes
Bennett, George (1834). Wanderings in New South Wales, Batavia, Pedir Coast, Singapore and China: being the journal of a naturalist in those countries, during 1832, 1833 and 1834 (Vol. 2)  London: Richard Bentley, University of Hong Kong Libraries, Digital Initiatives, China Through Western Eyes

References

External links

National Library of Australia: Wanderings & Gatherings, Travels of a Surgeon–Naturalist

1804 births
1893 deaths
Australian curators
19th-century Australian medical doctors
English curators
English naturalists
Fellows of the Linnean Society of London
Fellows of the Zoological Society of London
Fellows of the Royal College of Surgeons
Scientists from Plymouth, Devon
Australian book and manuscript collectors